William Henry Broadbent (20 November 1901 – March 1979) was an English professional footballer who played as a utility player in the Football League, most notably for Clapton Orient. Over the course of his career, Broadbent played every position bar goalkeeper.

Career statistics

References

1901 births
English footballers
English Football League players
Brentford F.C. players
Association football utility players
Oldham Athletic A.F.C. players
Leyton Orient F.C. players
Preston North End F.C. players
People from Oldham
1979 deaths
Manchester North End F.C. players
Association football midfielders